Do That In Real Life? is a radio drama, produced by the ZBS Foundation. It is the fifteenth of the Jack Flanders adventure series and the third of the Travelling Jack sub-series. It combines elements of Old-time radio with psychic phenomena, supernatural beings and energies.

Plot
Jack is having a nightmare of being chased by a zombie when Mojo calls. Mojo's playing piano at Frenchie's in New Orleans and needs Jack to help him with some real life zombie problems in the city. Almost immediately after his arrival in New Orleans, Jack draws the attention of a shape-shifting voodoo princess who may in fact be something even more dangerous from his past! Dealing with Dominique and a wandering zombie are the least of his worries.

Notes & Themes
There are a number of references to Jack's prior relationship with an Infrit, Layla Oolupi. Sophia, or the entity who entered her, knows many of the details of Jack's adventures in Morocco and claims to be someone that Jack loved and then abandoned, breaking her heart in the process. Mojo asks Madame Ebbo, who describes the being in such a way that Jack clearly identifies it as Layla but Madame Ebbo disagrees that it is her and suggests it's a rival Infrit, jealous of Layla.

This story contains an aside in which Dominique tells the tale of Le Petit Lafitte, later given a cd release of its own with three more stories.

Quotes
Madame Ebbo: "Do you have another question?"
Jack: "You know, I'd love to get an answer to the first one!"

Credits
 Jack Flanders - Robert Lorick
 Mojo Sam - Dave Adams
 Dominique - Lindsay Ellison
 Claudine - Pascale Poirier
 Madame Ebbo - Maryse Dejean
 Sophia - Karen Evans Candel
 The Zombie - Jim Post
 Rufus - Bill Raymond
 Waiter - Patrick Donovan
 Narrator - Kirby Airs
 Producer/Director/Engineer - Tom Lopez
 Writer - Meatball Fulton
 Music - Tim Clark
 Illustration/Graphics - Jaye Oliver
 Zombie consultant - Marushka Wolfgang Fulton
 Street Savy Consultant - Rodger Collins

Recorded and mixed at Froggy Acres, Fort Miller, NY

"Special thanks to John Romkey and to all friends of ZBS who helped make this series possible."

Travelling Jack
Every Travelling Jack adventure begins with a phone call from Mojo, asking for Jack's help. Usually the call wakes Jack up. During the call, Mojo drops more and more hints as to where in the world he is. None of the adventures involve the Invisible Realms, as such.
 Dreams of the Blue Morpho (2002)
 Somewhere Next Door to Reality (2002)
 Do That in Real Life? (2003)
 The Eye of Van Gogh (2003)

References

External links
 ZBS Foundation
 Whirlitzer of Wisdom fansite

2003 radio dramas
American radio dramas
ZBS Foundation